Terre Hill is a borough in Lancaster County, Pennsylvania, United States. The population was 1,363 at the 2020 census.

History
Terre Hill was formerly known as "Fairville". It was incorporated as a borough in 1907 after a successful court battle to separate from East Earl Township. 

The borough was once considered to be the hub of cigar-making in Lancaster County. One of its most recognizable landmarks is the 19th-century clock at the borough hall.

Terre Hill has the second fewest residents of any incorporated borough in Lancaster County, with the exception of Christiana. Terre Hill has no traffic lights as of 2021.

Geography
Terre Hill is located in northeastern Lancaster County at  (40.157565, -76.050410). Pennsylvania Route 897 is the borough's Main Street, leading north  to Swartzville and south  to East Earl.

The community is on high ground overlooking the Weaverland Valley of eastern Lancaster County and is part of the watershed of the Conestoga River, a southwest-flowing tributary of the Susquehanna River.

Demographics

As of the census of 2000, there were 1,237 people, 440 households, and 349 families residing in the borough. The population density was 2,710.3 people per square mile (1,038.3/km2). There were 454 housing units at an average density of 994.7 per square mile (381.1/km2). The racial makeup of the borough was 98.63% White, 0.16% African American, 0.08% Native American, 0.73% from other races, and 0.40% from two or more races. Hispanic or Latino of any race were 1.86% of the population.

There were 440 households, out of which 40.9% had children under the age of 18 living with them, 67.7% were married couples living together, 7.0% had a female householder with no husband present, and 20.5% were non-families. 17.3% of all households were made up of individuals, and 5.5% had someone living alone who was 65 years of age or older. The average household size was 2.81 and the average family size was 3.17.

In the borough the population was spread out, with 29.7% under the age of 18, 8.2% from 18 to 24, 30.1% from 25 to 44, 20.0% from 45 to 64, and 12.1% who were 65 years of age or older. The median age was 34 years. For every 100 females there were 101.8 males. For every 100 females age 18 and over, there were 97.3 males.

The median income for a household in the borough was $47,083, and the median income for a family was $47,891. Males had a median income of $36,815 versus $21,442 for females. The per capita income for the borough was $19,128. About 3.2% of families and 4.8% of the population were below the poverty line, including 7.0% of those under age 18 and 4.0% of those age 65 or over.

Annual events
The borough has numerous public events throughout the year for residents and community members. These special events are sponsored by the fundraising group Terre Hill Days Committee. The committee donates all of its proceeds to maintenance and upkeep of the Terre Hill Park. Some events include Breakfast & Yard Sales in the Park, Lunch in the Park, Ice Cream Social, Terre Hill Community Auction, Christmas Decorating Contest, Santa's Workshop, and a Community Egg Hunt. Terre Hill's main event is Terre Hill Days. In 2007, the borough celebrated its centennial year with a special Terre Hill Days festival.

Starting in 2018, a Christmas in the Park event has been held as a fundraiser for Terre Hill Park.

Terre Hill in popular culture
In 1980, Calvin Trillin wrote a humorous article in The New Yorker about a dispute between the fire company of Terre Hill and its ladies auxiliary.

References

External links

 
 Terre Hill Days Committee

Populated places established in 1900
Boroughs in Lancaster County, Pennsylvania
1907 establishments in Pennsylvania